Filipinos is the brand name for a series of biscuit doughnut snacks made by Mondelez International. In France, Spain, Portugal and the Nordic countries they are produced and sold under the 'Artiach' brand name. Under license to United Biscuits, in the Netherlands they are sold and produced locally under the Verkade brand. They have drawn controversy for having the same name as the people of the Philippines.

Variations 
The standard Filipinos snack is ring shaped and come in several varieties coated in either milk chocolate, dark chocolate, or white chocolate.  Milk or dark chocolate versions feature a light colored biscuit.  White chocolate versions feature a dark brown biscuit.  These can be purchased in large rolls.  The dark and white chocolate versions are also available in the "Filipinos GoPack" or "Mini Filipinos", a smaller loose packet of four biscuits.

"Filipinos Agujeros" (holes) are crisp doughnut hole sized balls coated in either dark or white chocolate. "Filipinos Bigsticks" are crispy 20 cm (8 in) stick shaped snacks covered with puffed rice.  These are coated in either dark or white chocolate.

Controversy 

The government of the Philippines filed a diplomatic protest with the government of Spain, the European Commission and the then manufacturer Nabisco Iberia in 1999. The protest objected to the use of the name "Filipinos", a term which can refer to the people of the Philippines, to market cookie and pretzel snacks and demanded that Nabisco stop selling the product until the brand name was changed.

The resolution's author, former Philippine Congressman and Senator Heherson Alvarez, claimed that the name of the cookie was offensive due to the apparent reference to their color, "dark outside and white inside".  His resolution stated "These food items could be appropriately called by any other label, but the manufacturers have chosen our racial identity, and they are now making money out of these food items."  On August 26, 1999, the Philippine president Joseph Estrada called the brand "an insult".

The protest was filed despite Foreign Secretary Domingo Siazon's initial reluctance on the matter. Siazon had reportedly said he saw nothing wrong with the use of 'Filipinos' as a brand name, noting Austrians do not complain that small sausages are called 'Vienna sausages'.

The controversial snack has been sold on the market for over 40 years. There were statements however, that the chocolate-covered snack was named "Filipinos" due to its brown outer layer and white inside before the snack was bought by Nabisco.

References

External links
 
 Verkade product assortment

Brand name snack foods
United Biscuits brands
Mondelez International brands
Philippines–Spain relations
Obscenity controversies